Blagoveshchensk is the name of several urban localities in Russia:
Blagoveshchensk, a city and the administrative center of Amur Oblast
Blagoveshchensk, Republic of Bashkortostan, a town in the Republic of Bashkortostan

See also
Blagoveshchensky (disambiguation)
Blagoveshchenka